26 Field Artillery Regiment was an artillery regiment of the South African Artillery.

History

Origins
This unit was originally formed as the first Field Artillery Regiment for the Northern Transvaal Command on 1 July 1976 and was based in Voortrekkerhoogte, south of Pretoria.

First Personnel
Its first intake of personnel came from roughly 100 members of 14 Field Artillery Regiment who had served in Operation Savanah as part of Combat Groups Oranje and Zulu that were involved most notably in the battle for Bridge 14.

Headquarters
By 1981 the regiment’s headquarters was transferred to Group 15 in Hendrik Potgieter Street in the CBD, but later returned to Voortrekkerhoogte.

Command
The regiment was transferred to the command of Eastern Transvaal Command in 1984 as a conventional field regiment.

The regiment was also affiliated with 8th Armoured Division in the conventional context.

Traditions from the Anglo Boer War
The regiments two senior batteries were named after two guns used in the Anglo Boer War, namely the Martieni and Ras.

Operations
Members of the regiment were utilised in the Soutpansberg Military Area on the border area with Zimbabwe.

Traditions
On the 100th year celebration of the Ras gun, the regiment celebrated with a salute in Bokfontein near Brits in 1981, the hometown of the guns developer.

Insignia
The regiment's insignia is based on the Ras gun of the Anglo Boer War with the typical artillery colours as background.

Commanding Officers

References 

 Further reading:

External links
 Defenceweb fact file
 Gunner's Association

Artillery regiments of South Africa
Disbanded military units and formations in Pretoria
Military units and formations established in 1976
Military units and formations of South Africa in the Border War
Military units and formations of South Africa
1976 establishments in South Africa